IL-17 or IL 17 may refer to:
 Interleukin 17, a pro-inflammatory cytokine
 Illinois's 17th congressional district
 Illinois Route 17